Bruno Felix Bianchi Massey (born 17 February 1989, in San Nicolás de los Arroyos) is an Argentine professional footballer who plays as a centre-back for Argentine Primera División club Atlético Tucumán.

He has previously played for Estudiantes of Argentina during his youth, Universidad San Martín of Peru, Palestino of Chile, Lemona of Spain, Douglas Haig and Unión of Argentina.

Career

Club
Bianchi's career started in the youth ranks of Estudiantes, before departing to join Peruvian club Universidad San Martín. During one year with the club he won the 2008 Torneo Descentralizado. In 2009, he completed a move to Chilean side Palestino with whom he made 9 appearances for as the team failed to reach the play-offs twice. 2010 saw Bianchi make the move out of South America for the first time as he joined Spanish Segunda División B (third tier) club Lemona, however a year later he returned to South America as he signed for Argentine club Douglas Haig. He stayed with Douglas Haig for two years and left in 2012, but departed as the team had just won the Torneo Argentino A and therefore gained promotion into the Primera B Nacional.

In July 2012, Bianchi joined Unión. He made his first career appearance in the Argentine Primera División on 10 September in a draw with Tigre. After 19 appearances and two goals in the 2012–13 season, he left Unión to sign for another Primera División team, Atlético Tucumán. Between 2013 and 2016, Bianchi has become a regular for the club after making 117 appearances over five seasons in the Primera División and Primera B Nacional respectively; Atlético Tucumán were in Argentina's second tier until 2015 when Bianchi and the club won it to win promotion into the top division.

Career statistics

Club
.

Honours
Universidad San Martín
 Peruvian Primera División (1): 2008

Douglas Haig
 Torneo Argentino A (1): 2011–12

Atlético Tucumán
 Primera B Nacional (1): 2015

References

External links
 Sports Ya profile
 BDFA profile
 Bruno Bianchi at Soccerway

1989 births
Living people
People from San Nicolás de los Arroyos
Argentine sportspeople of Italian descent
Argentine footballers
Argentine expatriate footballers
Association football defenders
Club Deportivo Universidad de San Martín de Porres players
Club Deportivo Palestino footballers
Club Atlético Douglas Haig players
SD Lemona footballers
Unión de Santa Fe footballers
Atlético Tucumán footballers
Newell's Old Boys footballers
Club Atlético Colón footballers
Argentine Primera División players
Primera Nacional players
Expatriate footballers in Peru
Expatriate footballers in Chile
Expatriate footballers in Spain
Argentine expatriate sportspeople in Peru
Argentine expatriate sportspeople in Chile
Argentine expatriate sportspeople in Spain
Sportspeople from Buenos Aires Province